Mununggurr is the family name of a number of notable Indigenous Australians from the Yolngu people of Arnhem Land:

 Dhambit Mununggurr (born 1968), Australian painter known for ultramarine blue bark paintings
Marrnyula Mununggurr (born 1964), Australian painter of the Djapu clan
 Milkayngu Mununggurr, musician, founder member of Yothu Yindi
 Rerrkirrwanga Mununggurr  (born 1971), Australian painter of the Djapu clan
 Wonggu Mununggurr (c.1880–1959), Australian artist and leader of the Djapu clan